The Burnt Cabins Gristmill Property is an historic house and gristmill which are located in Burnt Cabins, Pennsylvania. It is also a contributing property to the Burnt Cabins Historic District.

History and architectural features
 This historic property, which is located on Allen's Valley Road, within Dublin Township, Fulton County, Pennsylvania, includes a gristmill and house that were built in 1840. It was listed on the National Register of Historic Places in 1980.

It is also a contributing property to the Burnt Cabins Historic District.

The property was also documented in the Historic American Buildings Survey in 1990.

See also
National Register of Historic Places listings in Fulton County, Pennsylvania

References

Flour mills in the United States
Buildings and structures completed in 1840
Buildings and structures in Fulton County, Pennsylvania
Grinding mills in Pennsylvania
Grinding mills on the National Register of Historic Places in Pennsylvania